Bob Marley and the Wailers (previously known as The Wailers, and prior to that The Wailing Rudeboys, The Wailing Wailers and The Teenagers) were a Jamaican ska, rocksteady and reggae band. The founding members, in 1963, were Bob Marley (Robert Nesta Marley), Peter Tosh (Hubert Winston McIntosh), and Bunny Wailer (Neville Livingston).

During 1970 and 1971, Wailer, Marley and Tosh worked with renowned reggae producers Leslie Kong and Lee "Scratch" Perry.

They released four albums before signing to Island Records in 1972. Two more albums were created before Tosh and Wailer left the band in 1974, citing grievances over label treatment and ideological differences.  Marley carried on with a new line-up, including the I-Threes that put out seven more more albums. Marley died in 1981.

The Wailers were a groundbreaking ska and reggae group, noted for songs such as "Simmer Down", "Trenchtown Rock", "Nice Time", "War", "Stir It Up" and "Get Up, Stand Up".

History

Early years
The band formed when self-taught musician Peter Tosh (1944–1987) met the singers  Bunny Wailer (1947–2021) and Bob Marley (1945–1981) in 1963. They developed a ska vocal group called The Teenagers.

The band topped the Jamaican charts with "Simmer Down", which was recorded in 1963 at Studio One with the rhythm section from the studio house band The Skatalites. Simmer down was an overnight hit and played an essential role in changing the musical agenda in Jamaica from imitating foreign artists, to capturing the lives and spirit of Jamaica. 

Wailer, Marley and Tosh recorded with Lee "Scratch" Perry and his studio band the Upsetters. They also worked with renowned reggae producer Leslie Kong, who used his studio musicians, called Beverley's All-Stars (Jackie Jackson, Paul Douglas, Gladstone Anderson, Winston Wright, Rad Bryan, Hux Brown) to record the songs that would be released as an album titled The Best of The Wailers.

By late 1963, singers Junior Braithwaite, Beverley Kelso, and Cherry Smith had joined the group. The line-up consisted of Braithwaite on vocals, Marley on guitar, Tosh on keyboard, Wailer on percussion, with Smith and or Kelso on backing vocals. Kelso remembered those early recordings fondly:

In 1965, Kelso left the band. Marley, Tosh, Wailer and Braithwaite took turns on lead vocals. Braithwaite left shortly after providing lead vocals for the single It Hurts to be Alone, leaving the band consisting of the trio of Wailer, Marley and Tosh. The band's first full length album, The Wailing Wailers, was released the same year, a compilation of tracks recorded at different times.

In 1966, they created a rocksteady record label Wail N Soul M. Constantine "Dream" Walker provided backing vocals from 1966-67.

In May 1970, the band recorded with renowned reggae producer Leslie Kong; producing The Best of the Wailers, which they released later in 1971 as their fourth album. Over the rest of 1970 and 1971, the band worked with Lee 'Scratch' Perry, producing the bands second and third albums, Soul Rebels (1970) and Soul Revolution Part II (1971). During this time, the Upsetters members Aston "Family Man" Barrett (bass) and his brother Carlton Barrett (drums) were recruited as instrumental backing for The Wailers.

Signing to Island Records 
In 1972, while in London, the Wailers asked their road manager Brent Clarke to introduce them to Chris Blackwell, who had licensed some of their Coxsone releases for his Island Records. The Wailers felt they were due royalties from these releases. Blackwell was not convinced, but he was impressed by their character. He thought they "exuded  power and self-possession" despite being poor. Despite not having seen the band perform live, he advanced them £4,000 to record an album. He did not even require them to sign anything, feeling they deserved a break. Jimmy Cliff, Island's top reggae star, had recently left the label. His departure may have primed Blackwell to find a replacement. In Marley, Blackwell recognized the elements needed to snare the rock audience: "I was dealing with rock music, which was really rebel music. I felt that would really be the way to break Jamaican music. But you needed someone who could be that image. When Bob walked in, he really was that image." The Wailers returned to Jamaica to record at Harry J's in Kingston, which resulted in the foundational tracks what would make up the album Catch a Fire. Primarily recorded on an eight-track, Catch a Fire marked the first time a reggae band had access to a state-of-the-art studio and were accorded the same care as their rock 'n' roll peers.

The tracks were taken to Island Studios in London and worked on by Blackwell, with Marley supervising. Blackwell desired the tracks to appeal to rock audiences in the United Kingdom and United States, to whom the band would be novel. To this end, he made the tracks sound "more of a drifting, hypnotic-type feel than a reggae rhythm". He restructured Marley's mixes and arrangements. The tracks were overdubbed with the help of Wayne Perkins on guitar and John “Rabbit” Bundrick on keyboard. The mix deviated from the bass-heavy sound of Jamaican music, and two tracks were omitted. The album released in April 1973, closely followed by [[Burnin' (Bob Marley and the Wailers album)|Burnin''']] in October 1973.

Tosh and Livingston departure and I-Threes
In 1974, Tosh and Livingston left the band due to their refusal to play "freak clubs". The pair believed doing so would violate their Rastafarian faith. Tosh believed that producer Blackwell, whom he unfavorably called "Chris Whiteworst", was responsible for the bad relationship between the band members. He thought Blackwell favored Marley over the rest of the band, giving him more attention and money, and with the decision to release their albums under the name "Bob Marley and the Wailers" instead of "The Wailers".

Marley continued with a new line-up, which included the Aston Barrett (bass), Carlton Barrett (drums), Junior Marvin (lead guitar), Al Anderson (lead guitar), Tyrone Downie (keyboards), Earl "Wya" Lindo (keyboards), and Alvin "Seeco" Patterson on percussion. Additionally, the I-Threes provided female backing vocals. The three I-Three members were Marley's wife Rita Marley, Judy Mowatt and Marcia Griffiths. Their name is a spin on the Rastafarian "I and I" concept of the Godhead within each person.

The album Natty Dread was released in 1974, the first without Tosh and Livingston and with the I-Threes.

Perry released two compilation albums for Trojan Records in 1974, Rasta Revolution and African Herbsman, which contained songs from Soul Rebels and Soul Revolution Part II, respectively, and he was the copyright holder of several songs from these albums. These changes caused a major dispute between Marley and Perry, when the former saw the albums, six months after their publication, in the Half Way Road in England.

One of the last performances that included Marley was in 1980 at Madison Square Garden. Marley died in 1981.

Later years
The music of Marley, Tosh and Wailer enjoyed considerable success as reggae music continued to gain popularity during 1980s.

Carlton Barrett and Tosh died (both murdered) in 1987.

The Wailers Band was formed by Aston Barrett in 1989.

Braithwaite was murdered in 1999.

The Original Wailers was formed by Anderson and Marvin in 2008, Cherry Smith died in 2008.

Earl Lindo died in 2017, and Wailer died 2021.

Keyboardist Tyrone Downie died in 2022.

Beverley Kelso, Constantine Walker and Aston Barrett are the only surviving members of the group's line-ups.

 Legacy 
In 2001, Catch a Fire was reissued as a double album, with the first part being the previously unreleased 'Jamaican' versions of the song without Blackwell's overdubs and the second part being the album as it was released in 1972.

In March 2013, an overview of most of the music made by The Wailers prior to their signing to Island Records was published by the Roots Reggae Library.

Band members

 Bob Marley – rhythm guitar, lead vocals (1963–1981; died 1981)
 Peter Tosh – lead guitar, keyboard, vocals (1963–1974; died 1987)
 Bunny Wailer – percussion, vocals (1963–1974; died 2021)
 Cherry Smith – backing vocals (1963–1966; died 2008)
 Beverley Kelso – backing vocals (1963–1965)
 Junior Braithwaite – vocals (1963–1964; died 1999)
 Constantine Walker – backing vocals (1966–1967)
 Aston Barrett – bass (1970–1981)
 Carlton Barrett – drums, percussion (1970–1981; died 1987)
 Earl Lindo – keyboards (1973, 1978–1981; died 2017)

 Tyrone Downie – keyboards, percussion, backing vocals (1974–1981; died 2022)
 Rita Marley – backing vocals (1974–1981)
 Marcia Griffiths – backing vocals (1974–1981)
 Judy Mowatt – backing vocals (1974–1981)
 Al Anderson – guitar (1974–1975, 1978–1981)
 Alvin Patterson – percussion (1975–1981; died 2021)
 Earl "Chinna" Smith – guitar (1975–1976)
 Donald Kinsey – guitar (1975–1976)
 Junior Marvin – guitar, backing vocals (1977–1981)
 

Discography

 The Wailing Wailers (1965)
 The Best of the Wailers (1970; released 1971)
 Soul Rebels (1970)
 Soul Revolution Part II (1971)
 Catch a Fire (1973)
 Burnin' (1973)
 Natty Dread (1974)
 Rastaman Vibration (1976)
 Exodus (1977)
 Kaya (1978)
 Survival (1979)
 Uprising (1980)
 Confrontation (1983)

Tours
 Apr–Jul 1973: Catch a Fire Tour (England, USA)
 Oct–Nov 1973: Burnin' Tour (USA, England)
 Jun–Jul 1975: Natty Dread Tour (USA, Canada, England)
 Apr–Jul 1976: Rastaman Vibration Tour (USA, Canada, Germany, Sweden, Netherlands, France, England, Wales)
 May–Jun 1977: Exodus Tour (France, Belgium, Netherlands, Germany, Sweden, Denmark, England)
 May–Aug 1978: Kaya Tour (USA, Canada, England, France, Spain, Sweden, Denmark, Norway, Netherlands, Belgium)
 Apr–May 1979: Babylon by Bus Tour (Japan, New Zealand, Australia, Hawaii)
 Oct 1979 – Jan 1980: Survival Tour (USA, Canada, Trinidad/Tobago, Bahamas, Gabon, Zimbabwe)
 May–Sep 1980: Uprising Tour (Switzerland, Germany, France, Norway, Sweden, Denmark, Belgium, Netherlands, Italy, Spain, Ireland, England, Scotland, Wales, USA)

See also
 The Upsetters
 Word, Sound and Power
 The Wailers Band
 The Original Wailers

References

Further reading
Masouri, John (2007) Wailing Blues: The Story of Bob Marley's "Wailers" Wise Publications 
Farley, Christopher (2007). Before the Legend: The Rise of Bob Marley, Amistad Press 
Goldman, Vivien (2007) The Book of Exodus: The Making and Meaning of Bob Marley and the Wailers' Album of the Century Three Rivers Press 
Colin Grant (2011) The Natural Mystics : Marley, Tosh, Wailer'', Jonathan Cape 978-0-224-08608-0 (U.K.), W.W. Norton & Company  (U.S.)

External links

 
45cat Bob Marley discography
www.MusicGonnaTeach.com – The Wailers (Bob, Peter & Bunny)

 
First-wave ska groups
Island Records artists
Jamaican reggae musical groups
Jamaican ska groups
Musical groups established in 1963
Musical groups disestablished in 1981
Trojan Records artists
1963 establishments in Jamaica
1981 disestablishments in Jamaica